Cargill MacMillan Jr. (March 29, 1927 – November 14, 2011) was an American billionaire businessman, a director of Cargill.

Early life
He was born in Hennepin County, Minnesota on March 29, 1927, the eldest son of Cargill MacMillan Sr. (1900–1968) and Pauline Whitney (1900–1990). MacMillan served in the US Air Force and then graduated from Yale University in 1950.

Career
MacMillan worked at Cargill for 38 years, and retired in 1988. MacMillan is credited with designing the Cargill Office Center in Minnetonka, Minnesota.

MacMillan served on the boards of Abbott Northwestern Hospital, Minneapolis Society of Fine Arts, Twin Cities Public Television, Minneapolis Institute of Arts, Macalester College, Greater Minneapolis Chamber of Commerce, United Way of the Minneapolis Area, the Johnson Institute, Northwestern National Bank of Minneapolis, Community First Bank, Minnesota Outward Bound School, and the YMCA.

In 1990, he moved to Indian Wells, California. He died at his home there on November 14, 2011 from complications of Parkinson's disease, with an estimated net worth of at $2.6 billion.

Personal life
MacMillan was survived by his wife, Donna, and their six children.

References

External links
 

1927 births
2011 deaths
Cargill people
American billionaires
People from Hennepin County, Minnesota
People from Indian Wells, California
Deaths from Parkinson's disease
Neurological disease deaths in California
20th-century American businesspeople